Rhinodrilus is a genus of large South American earthworms. It belongs to the family Glossoscolecidae.

This genus consists of the following species

 Rhinodrilus alatus 
 Rhinodrilus annulatus 
 Rhinodrilus appuni 
 Rhinodrilus appuni appuni 
 Rhinodrilus appuni pavoni 
 Rhinodrilus brasiliensis 
 Rhinodrilus bursiferus 
 Rhinodrilus contortus 
 Rhinodrilus duseni 
 Rhinodrilus fafner (possibly extinct)
 Rhinodrilus garbei 
 Rhinodrilus hoeflingae 
 Rhinodrilus horsti 
 Rhinodrilus juncundus 
 Rhinodrilus lakei 
 Rhinodrilus papillifer 
 Rhinodrilus paradoxus 
 Rhinodrilus pitun 
 Rhinodrilus priollii 
 Rhinodrilus romani

References

Haplotaxida
Taxa named by Edmond Perrier